Peter Fleming and John McEnroe were the defending champions, but finished runner-up this year.

Kevin Curren and Steve Denton won the title, defeating Fleming and McEnroe 6–4, 7–6(7–2) in the final.

Seeds
All seeds receive a bye into the second round.

Draw

Finals

Top half

Bottom half

References

External links
 Draw

U.S. Pro Indoor
1983 Grand Prix (tennis)